Thomas Purcell, known professionally as Wave Racer, is an Australian musician, multi-instrumentalist and music producer. The name "Wave Racer" is adapted from the Nintendo 64 game Wave Race 64. His debut single, consisting of two songs, "Rock U Tonite" and "Stoopid", was released in 2013. The same year, he signed with Australian independent record label Future Classic, who also signed other electronic artists including Cashmere Cat and Flume.

His "Flash Drive" EP was released in 2015, featuring a guest appearance by Lido. In 2021, he released his debut full-length album, To Stop From Falling Off The Earth.

He has performed in the United States at Ultra Music Festival, on Mad Decent's Block Party Tour and in support of Chromeo on their "Frequent Flyer Tour". Australian festival highlights include Splendour In The Grass, Field Day, Groovin' the Moo and Falls Festival. He has also toured in support of Disclosure during their Australian tour in 2014, and Porter Robinson during his Australian tour in 2015, alongside Cosmo's Midnight.

Early life and career 
Purcell was born in Sydney, New South Wales on 26 April 1992. He has cited his start in electronic dance music production as being part of a disco house duo with his friend called "Pablo J & The Lobsterettes". Speaking about the comparison of his music to the likes of Cashmere Cat and Hudson Mohawke, Purcell quoted them as massive influences and said "...people often describe my music as future bass".

In 2014, he released the stand-alone single "Streamers". It was described as a 'tropical, glitchy tune' with elements of trap and futuristic indie-dance. In 2015, he released the songs "Flash Drive (featuring B▲BY)" and "World Record (featuring Lido)", as singles for his debut EP Flash Drive. The EP consisted of 4 tracks and was released on October 15, 2015. The title track, "Flash Drive", was featured in the official soundtrack for the 2016 racing video game Forza Horizon 3.

In 2017, Wave Racer's remix of Flight Facilities' "Stand Still" was sampled without clearance by Fetty Wap in his song "Way You Are".

On April 24, 2021, Wave Racer performed live as a part of Porter Robinson's virtual festival Secret Sky. The performance featured Wave Racer playing his original music with a live band.

On August 6, 2021, Wave Racer was featured on Triple J's "Like A Version" segment, in which he performed a cover of The 1975's "It's Not Living (If It's Not With You)", as well as his single "Look Up To Yourself".

On October 29, 2021, Wave Racer released his debut full-length album To Stop From Falling Off The Earth through Astral People Recordings, a co-operative record label formed with PIAS. The album contains 11 songs, and for the first time, features Purcell's own vocal performances and lyrics, as well as the prominent use of electric guitar and synthesisers. The album received 4 out of 5 stars in reviews from NME and Rolling Stone Australia. The album also received praise from French electronic musician Madeon.

Awards
In 2013, Wave Racer was nominated for a J Award in the "Unearthed Artist of the Year" category. In 2015, he won the FBi SMAC (Sydney's Music Arts & Culture) Award for "Best Producer".

Discography

Studio albums

EPs

Singles

Remixes 
2013
 Flight Facilities featuring Mickey Green – "Stand Still (Wave Racer Remix)"
 Panama – "Always (Wave Racer Remix)"
 DCUP featuring Mereki – "Don't Be Shy (Wave Racer Remix)"
 Cosmo's Midnight – "The Dofflin (Wave Racer Remix)"
Ghost Town DJ's – "My Boo (Wave Racer Remix)"
2014
 Foster The People – "Best Friend (Wave Racer Remix)"
 Ryan Hemsworth – "Ryan Must Be Destroyed (Wave Racer Remix)"
2015
 Duke Dumont – "The Giver (Reprise) (Wave Racer Remix)"
 Snakehips featuring Chance The Rapper & Tinashe – "All My Friends (Wave Racer Remix)"
2016
 Flume featuring Kai – "Never Be like You (Wave Racer Remix)"
2017

 Tkay Maidza featuring Killer Mike – "Carry On (Wave Racer Remix)"

Covers 
2021

 "Seventeen" – cover of No Rome
 "It's Not Living (If It's Not With You)" – cover of The 1975 (performed live for Triple J's "Like A Version")

References 

Australian DJs
Future bass musicians
Musicians from Sydney
DJs from Sydney
Australian house musicians
Electronic musicians
Living people
Future house musicians
Electronic dance music DJs
1992 births